Emticicia ginsengisoli  is a Gram-negative, strictly aerobic, rod-shaped and non-motile bacterium from the genus of Emticicia which has been isolated from soil from a ginseng field in Pocheon in Korea.

References

External links
Type strain of Emticicia ginsengisoli at BacDive -  the Bacterial Diversity Metadatabase

Cytophagia
Bacteria described in 2008